Harakat Ahrar al-Iraq was formed under the name of Quwat Ahrar al-Iraq (Force of the Free Men of Iraq) on 14 June 2014 according to the fatwa of the Grand Mufti Sheikh Mahdi Al-Sumaidaie, the grand mufti of the Republic of Iraq on the necessity of enlisting and defending Iraq.

Quwat Ahrar al-Iraq was formed in Baghdad and the first battles were in Tikrit and Baiji, and then in Anbar. In addition to these areas, Quwat Ahrar al-Iraq fought in order to liberate Iraq from ISIS in; Anbar: al-Hawz area, al-Mal'ab, Hit, Haditha, al-Baghdadi, Jazirat al-Khalidiya, Jazirat Rawa, Rawa, Anah and Rutba. In Salah al-Din; Tikrit, Baiji, Shirqat. Kirkuk, Mosul, Qayarra and the east of the Tigris River and Rabi'a (Ninawa countryside), as well as Baghdad and al-Mashahadah. According to Anas Mahdi al-Sumaida'ie, secretary general of Harakat Ahrar al-Iraq, during these battles Quwat Ahrar al-Iraq had 250 casualties and more than 700 wounded.

Quwat Ahrar al-Iraq was registered in the Popular Mobilization Forces on 8 November 2014 under the 86th Brigade.

According to Anas Mahdi, in 2018 Iraqi parliamentary elections, one of the candidates affiliated with the Quwat Ahrar al-Iraq obtained more than 13,000 votes in Ninawa province "but the votes were taken after modification and the great conspiracy in the elections".

Harakat Ahrar al-Iraq, on 26 June 2022 committed rocket attacks against Turkish Zlikan base, Iraq. Four rockets were used in the attacks. No casualties were recorded.

In 21 July 2022, Harakat Ahrar al-Iraq responded to Zakho resort attack where nine civilians, including two children were murdered by the Turkish military by stating; "Our response will not be ink on paper, but with rockets, marches, missiles. We are among the vengeful criminals."

References

Insurgencies
Insurgencies in Asia
Islamism in Iraq